The following highways are numbered 847:

United States